Gary L. Kreps is a health and risk communication scholar.  He is a Distinguished University Professor of communication at George Mason University in Fairfax, Virginia, United States, where he directs the Center for Health and Risk Communication.  Kreps is one of the founding scholars of the field of health communication, having published several of the earliest seminal books and articles on the topic, worked to establish the Health Communication Divisions at both the International Communication Association (ICA) and the National Communication Association (NCA), helped to found the Society for Health Communication, and spurred the introduction of major health communication research programs, courses and curricula around the globe.   

At George Mason University, Kreps served as Chair of the Department of Communication from 2004 to 2013.  He, spearheaded introduction of the department's leading international doctoral program in Health, Risk, and Strategic Communication. He held the Eileen and Steve Mandell Endowed Chair in Health Communication from 2004 to 2010, and was appointed as University Distinguished Professor in 2010.  Prior to joining the faculty at George Mason University, he served as Founding Chief of the Health Communication and Informatics Research Branch at the National Cancer Institute (NCI), where he introduced important national health communication research programs. He was the Founding Dean of the School of Communication at Hofstra University, Executive Director of the Greenspun School of Communication at UNLV, and served as a professor at Northern Illinois, Rutgers, IUPUI, and Purdue Northwest universities. 

His research, published in more than 500 frequently cited scholarly articles and books, examines the information needs of vulnerable populations facing serious health challenges to guide design and implementation of evidence-based health promotion policies, technologies, and practices. He has participated in externally funded research projects valued at more than $60 million and helped initiate and direct large intramural and extramural research programs at NCI, including HINTS (the Health Information National Trends Survey) the CECCRS (Centers of Excellence in Cancer Communication Research) program project grant, and the SBIR program in Multimedia Technology and Health Communication in Cancer Control.  He initiated and coordinates the INSIGHTS (International Studies to Investigate Global Health Information Trends) research consortium that collects population-level data about health information trends in more than 20 countries across five continents to inform evidence-based health communication and education efforts.  He co-directs (with Paula Kim) GALA (the Global Advocacy Leadership Academy) non-profit organization that supports the development of needed health advocacy programs around the globe. He advises major health promotion agencies, health care delivery systems, and health service organizations about research and policy.

Kreps has received many distinguished awards and honors for his work.  He was elected as a Fellow of the American Academy of Health Behavior in 2010 and as a Fellow of the ICA in 2019.  He was elected as an NCA Distinguished Scholar in 2019. He received the Research Laureate Award from the American Academy of Health Behavior in 2015.  Kreps has also received the NCA Dale Brashers Mentorship Award, the Gary Gumpert Urban Communication Research Award, the Endeavour Executive Fellowship from the Australian Department of Education, the FIRST Scholar Award from the University of Colorado, the Distinguished Communicator Award from the Virginia Academy of Communication Arts & Sciences, the NCA Distinguished Administrator Award, the ECA Health Communication Centennial Scholar Award, the Pfizer Professorship in Clear Health Communication, the Lewis Donahue Outstanding Health Communication Scholar Award from the University of Kentucky, the Future of Health Technology Award, the  Distinguished Achievement Award in Consumer Health Informatics and Online Health, the NCA/ICA Outstanding Health Communication Scholar Award, and the NCA Gerald M. Phillips Distinguished Applied Communication Scholar Award.

Early life, education, and work history

Gary was born August 17, 1952, in Queens, New York, to Sidney and Rhoda Kreps. Just  before Gary's birth his parents bought a small tract home in East Meadow (on Long Island in Nassau County), where Gary and his two younger sisters (Carol and Julia) grew up.  His father was one of the first people to develop the international air freight industry, working for several start-up air freight firms out of New York, before founding CAS Air Freight, which later merged with Jet Air Freight.  His mother was a homemaker, but also worked part-time out of their home as a physical therapist, helping many patients recover from debilitating health issues such as polio, paralysis, amputation, and degenerative muscle and bone disorders. His parents both grew up in Brooklyn, as first generation Americans of Jewish parents who had immigrated to the US in the early 1900s from Europe.  After graduating from high school, his mother earned an undergraduate degree from Brooklyn College and did post-graduate studies in physical therapy at the famed Mayo Clinic in Minnesota.  After his father graduated from Brooklyn Tech High School, he enlisted in the US Army during World War 2, where he served stateside as an airplane artillery instructor. Gary's interests in health care were likely related to his mother's work in physical therapy and his interests in international affairs grew out of his father's global travels working in the international air freight field. 

While growing up Gary worked many part-time jobs in food services (McDonald's, Arby's, snack shops, pizza shops, and ice cream parlors, as well as working for caterers as a waiter, busboy, valet parking clerk) and in warehousing and delivery services (at his father's air freight company at JFK Airport). He attended East Meadow High School, graduating in 1970.  In High School he participated in theater, acting in plays, and wrote for several school publications.  After high school he briefly attended Chamberlain College in Boston before dropping out to travel by car to San Francisco.  While in San Francisco Gary attended City College of San Francisco for two years, where he studied life sciences and dramatic literature.  From San Francisco he transferred to the University of Colorado in Boulder, where he received a scholarship, to study Communication, earning a B.A. degree in 1975, and later an M.A. degree in Communication in 1976.  He then enrolled in the Ph.D. program in Communication at the University of Southern California, where he received a graduate fellowship, earning his doctoral degree from USC in 1979.  He received the W. Charles Redding Organizational Communication Dissertation of the Year Award, second prize, from ICA in 1979.  While at USC he worked part-time as a communication Instructor for Chapman College (now Chapman University) and as a graduate teaching assistant at USC.

Gary's first full-time academic position as an Assistant Professor of Communication in the Department of Communication and Creative Arts at Purdue University Calumet (now Purdue University Northwest) was in 1978, a position he took while still completing his dissertation research at USC.  He taught at Purdue for two years and in 1980 accepted a position as Assistant Professor and Director of Organizational Communication n the Department of Communication and Theater at Indiana University-Purdue University in Indianapolis (IUPUI).  He taught at IUPUI for three years, serving as the Acting Department Chair in 1981, and as Director of the Interdisciplinary Health Studies Program, coordinating contributing academic programs in Liberal Arts, Medicine, Nursing, Science, Public & Environmental Affairs, and Journalism.  He was promoted to Associate Professor with tenure at IUPUI in 1982, and received the campus-wide Outstanding Educator of the Year Award that same year. In 1983 Gary took a new position as Assistant Professor of Communication in the School of Communication, Information, and Library Sciences at Rutgers University in New Brunswick New Jersey, where he taught until 1987.  During the 1985-1986 year, Gary was invited to serve as a Senior Research Fellow while on leave from Rutgers (funded by a federal Inter-professional Personnel Act appointment)  at the National Cancer Institute in Bethesda, Maryland to evaluate the NCI's new Physician Data Query online cancer information system, and returned to Rutgers for the 1986-1987 academic year.  In 1987 Gary was recruited to Northern Illinois University (NIU), initially serving as an Associate Professor with tenure and then promoted to Full Professor in 1988.   At NIU Gary served as the Director of Graduate Studies for the Department of Communication and had appointments in both the Gerontology Program and the International Training and Development Program.  In 1995 Gary left NIU to become Executive Director and Professor in the Greenspun School of Communication at UNLV.  In 1997 he became the Founding Dean and Professor in the School of Communication at Hofstra University in New York.  In 1999 he accepted an invitation to serve as the Founding Chief of the Health Communication and Informatics Research Branch at NCI, part of the Behavioral Research Program in the Division of Cancer Control and Population Sciences.  While at NCI he also served as the Founding Coordinator of the Trans-Department of Health and Human Services Health Communication Working Group.  In 2004, he left NCI to take a position as Chair of the Department of Communication (2004-2013) and the Eileen and Steven Mandell Endowed Chair in Health Communication (2004-2010) at George Mason University.  In 2010 he was appointed as a Distinguished University Professor.

Personal life

Gary married Stephanie Rode in San Francisco in 1972.  Gary worked part-time for Flying Tigers Air Freight loading and unloading freight from airplanes at San Francisco International Airport and also enrolled at City College of San Francisco. Gary and Stephanie's first child, Becky, was born in 1984 in New Brunswick, New Jersey, when Gary taught at Rutgers University.  Their second child, David was born in 1988 in St. Charles, Illinois, when Gary taught at NIU. The family has resided since 1999 in Gaithersburg, Maryland.

Education 
Kreps studied at the University of Colorado Boulder, obtaining a bachelor's degree in Communication in 1975 and a master's degree in Communication the following year. He went to the University of Southern California for graduate work, earning a PhD in Communication in 1979.

References

External links
 Faculty biography
 

George Mason University faculty
Living people
Year of birth missing (living people)